Alerce is the Spanish word for two unrelated trees Larix (larch) and Fitzroya, albeit the name was first applied to the larch.
 Alerce, Chile, a Chilean town
 Alerce Glacier
 Fitzroya cupressoides, a species of evergreen tree from South America, unrelated to the larch
 Alerce Costero National Park
 Alerce Andino National Park
 Alerce Prize, a Chilean literature award
 Los Alerces National Park
 Emepa Alerce, an Argentine train used on commuter rail services
 Alerce (wood type), the wood of the sandarac tree
Alerce, la otra música, a Chilean record label